The Internazionali Femminili di Brescia is a tournament for professional female tennis players played on outdoor clay courts. The event is classified as a $60,000 ITF Women's Circuit tournament and has been held in Brescia, Italy, since 2008.

Past finals

Singles

Doubles

External links
 ITF search 
 Official website 

ITF Women's World Tennis Tour
Clay court tennis tournaments
Tennis tournaments in Italy
Recurring sporting events established in 2008